The Sacramento Theatre Company (STC) is a non-profit Regional Professional Theatre in  Sacramento, California. It is the oldest theater troupe in the city.

History 
STC was formed in 1942 to entertain troops stationed in Sacramento during World War II.  It  was originally called the Sacramento Civic Repertory Theatre, until they moved in 1949 into their first theater home, The Eaglet Theatre.

The Eaglet was built from canvas and wood to match the Eagle Theatre from the California Gold Rush period.  The new theater benefited from the patronage of Eleanor McClatchy.

Today

STC is now located at the H Street Theatre Complex in Midtown Sacramento.  STC stages  plays in three performance spaces.  STC alumni include Richard Hellesen, Tim Ocel and Tom Hanks.

2018–2019 season 
The Crucible, by Arthur MillerSteel Magnolias, by Robert Harling,A Christmas Carol, Adapted by Richard Hellesen based on the novella by Charles Dickens, Murder for Two by Kellen Blair and book and music by Joe KinosianA Midsummer Night's Dream, by William ShakespeareWhen We Were Colored - A World Premiere Play, by Ginger Rutland, Disaster!

The 2018-2019 Cabaret SeriesHooray For Hollywood! Showtunes From Stage To Screen, November 8–11, 2018 All That Jazz: Broadway Swings, January 17–20, 2019 I Can't Do It Alone: Great Showbiz Duets, March 28–31, 2019

The 2018-2019 Youth SeriesMuch Ado About Nothing, By William Shakespeare, September 12–23, 2018 Mary Poppins Jr., January 10–13, 2019 The Secret Garden: Spring Edition, January 31 - February 3, 2019 Oh Freedom! The Story of the Underground Railroad, February 27 - March 3, 2019 The Tempest for Kids, May 8–19, 2019

The School of the Arts
STC offers elementary, middle, and high school students after-school and weekend training programs.

External links
 Official Website

Tourist attractions in Sacramento, California
Theatre companies in California
Culture of Sacramento, California